Providence Business News, nicknamed PBN, is a bi-weekly business newspaper focusing on the economy in Rhode Island and Bristol County, Massachusetts.

The newspaper was founded in March 1986 by Robert C. Bergenheim, who at the time was also publisher of the Boston Business Journal, and published its first issue that May. His son, Roger C. Bergenheim, has been the paper’s publisher for much of its history.

At the time it began, Providence Business News was one of three business publications in Rhode Island, the other two being Business Fortnightly of Rhode Island and Ocean State Business, both biweekly magazines. Business Fortnightly ceased publication in June 1986, and Ocean State Business closed up shop in 1990.

In 1987, Bergenheim sold his company, P&L Publications Inc., to MCP Inc. of Minneapolis, but retained part ownership in Providence Business News. Roger Bergenheim succeeded him as publisher of the Boston paper in 1988 and for a time David C. Dunbar, an advertising executive at Providence Business News, took over as that newspaper’s publisher, before Bergenheim returned to the post.

The paper was redesigned in 2004 by Creative Circle Media Consulting of Providence.

Prizes and awards
PBN was named 2020 Newspaper of the Year by the New England Newspaper and Press Association at the organization’s 2020 fall conference.

References

External links
PBN.com - Providence Business News
Providence Business News on The Alliance of Area Business Publications

Newspapers published in Rhode Island
Business newspapers published in the United States
Weekly newspapers published in the United States
Mass media in Providence, Rhode Island